The 2012 Oceania Boxing Olympic Qualification Tournament was held in Canberra, Australia from 21 to 25 March.

Qualified athletes

Qualification summary

Results

Light flyweight

Flyweight

Bantamweight

Lightweight

Light welterweight

Welterweight

Middleweight

Heavyweight

Super heavyweight

See also

 Boxing at the 2012 Summer Olympics – Qualification

References

 Men's Light Fly 46–49kg
 Men's Fly 52kg
 Men's Bantam 56kg
 Men's Light 60kg
 Men's Light Welter 64kg
 Men's Welter 69kg
 Men's Middle 75kg
 Men's Light Heavy 81kg
 Men's Heavy 91kg
 Men's Super Heavy +91kg

External links
 AIBA

Oceania Boxing Olympic Qualification Tournament
Oceania Boxing Olympic Qualification Tournament
Oceania Boxing Olympic Qualification Tournament
International boxing competitions hosted by Australia